Hans Adam or Hans-Adam may refer to:

Hans-Adam I, Prince of Liechtenstein (1657–1712), 3rd Prince of Liechtenstein
Hans-Adam II, Prince of Liechtenstein (born 1945), reigning 15th Prince of Liechtenstein

See also
Hans Ritter von Adam (1886–1917), German World War I flying ace
Hans Adam von Schöning (1641–1696), Generalfeldmarschall in Brandenburg-Prussia and Electorate of Saxony